Antonio de Lebrija may refer to:

 Antonio de Nebrija (1441–1522), also written as Antonio de Lebrija, Spanish historian and humanist
 Antonio de Lebrija (1507–1540), possibly his grandson, conquistador in Colombia